Kobra is a Zamperla Mega Disk’O Coaster which opened in 2010 at Chessington World of Adventures Resort in southwest London, England. As of May 2021, the ride continues to operate.

History
Kobra opened in the 2010 season in the new Wild Asia land at Chessington World of Adventures Resort. It was manufactured by Zamperla. It is only the second model of its type in Britain, after The Edge at Paulton's Park.

Description

As with all rides of its type, riders sit in a motorcycle-like position in outward-facing seats at the edge of the circular ride platform. The ride model features an airtime hill (AKA camel back hump) in the middle of the track, and two steep slopes at either end. The platform spins and travels backwards and forwards along the track at moderate speed.

Kobra features two large snake statues at either end of the track; giving the ride its name. Riders sit at the edge of a circular ride car, which spins along 90m of track at 43 mph. The ride model includes a camel back hill in the centre of the track to give the car airtime as it travels over.

Minimum height is 1.20 metres, with torso measurements approaching 51 inches.

Gallery

References

External links

2010 establishments in England
Chessington World of Adventures rides
Amusement rides introduced in 2010
Cultural infrastructure completed in 2010
Amusement rides manufactured by Zamperla
Fictional snakes